Didymus Chalcenterus (Latin; Greek: , Dídymos Chalkéderos, "Didymus Bronze-Guts"; c. 63 BC – c. AD 10), was an Ancient Greek scholar and grammarian who flourished in the time of Cicero and Augustus.

Life 
The epithet "Bronze-Guts" came from his indefatigable industry: he was said to have written so many books that he was unable to recollect what he had written in earlier ones, and so often contradicted himself. Athenaeus (4.139c) records that he wrote 3500 treatises, while Seneca gives the figure of 4000.  As a result, he acquired the additional nickname (vivlioláthas), meaning "Book-Forgetting" or "Book-forgetter", a term coined by Demetrius of Troezen.

He lived and taught in Alexandria and Rome, where he became the friend of Varro. He is chiefly important as having introduced Alexandrian learning to the Romans.

Works 
He was a follower of the school of Aristarchus, and wrote a treatise on Aristarchus' edition of Homer entitled On Aristarchus' recension ( perí tís Aristárchou diorthoséos), fragments of which are preserved in the Venetus A manuscript of the Iliad.

He also wrote monographs on many other Greek poets and prose authors. He is known to have written on Hesiod, the Greek lyric poets, notably Bacchylides and Pindar, and on drama; the better part of the Pindar and Sophocles scholia originated with Didymus. The Aristophanes scholia also cite him often, and he is known to have written treatises on Euripides, Ion, Phrynichus's Kronos, Cratinus, Menander, and many of the Greek orators including Demosthenes, Aeschines, Isaeus, Hypereides and Deinarchus.

Besides these commentaries there are mentions of the following works, none of which survives:

 On phraseology in tragedy ( perí tragodouménis léxeos), which comprised at least 28 books
 Comic phraseology ( léxis komikí), of which Hesychius made much use
 a third linguistic work on words of ambiguous or uncertain meaning, comprising at least seven books
 a fourth linguistic work on false or corrupt expressions
 a collection of Greek proverbs ( perí parimión) in 13 books, from which most of the proverbs in Zenobius' collection are taken.
 On the law-tablets of Solon ( perí tón axónon Sólonos), a work mentioned by Plutarch.
 He is attributed with writing a critique of Cicero's De re publica, comprising six books, referred to by Ammianus Marcellinus (22.16), which provoked Suetonius to counter with a defense of that Roman writer. The authenticity of the attribution has been questioned on the grounds there is no evidence Didymus knew Latin, and the suggestion the source may have confused Didymus Chalcenterus with Claudius Didymus, who wrote a critique of Thucydides' style, and a work comparing Latin and Greek.

In addition, there survive extracts on agriculture and botany, mention of a commentary on Hippocrates, and a completely surviving treatise On all types of marble and wood ( perí marmáron ke padíon xýlon). In view of the drastic difference in subject matter, it is possible that these represent the work of a different Didymos.

The Stoic philosopher, Seneca, in his Epistulae Morales ad Lucilium, claims that Didymus wrote 4000 books, while making a commentary on the acquisition of useless knowledge.

Further insight into Didymus' methods of writing was provided by the discovery of a papyrus fragment of his commentary on the Philippics of Demosthenes.  This confirms that he was not an original researcher, but a scrupulous compiler who made many quotations from earlier writers, and who was prepared to comment about chronology and history, as well as rhetoric and style.

In fiction
 Didymus is a lead character in Michael Livingston's 2015 historical fantasy novel The Shards of Heaven.

Sources

Editions 
 Scholia on the Iliad:  Erbse, H. 1969-88, Scholia Graeca in Homeri Iliadem, 7 vols. (Berlin)
 Didymus' work reconstructed from the Iliad scholia:  Schmidt, M. 1964 [1854], Didymi Chalcenteri grammatici Alexandrini fragmenta quae supersunt omnia, reprint (Amsterdam)
 The commentary on Demosthenes:, Didymos: On Demosthenes, edited with a translation by Philip Harding, 2006 (OUP)

See also
 Homeric scholarship
 Venetus A

Notes

Citations

Sources

Further reading
 Russell, H.A. 1948, "Old Brass-Guts", The Classical Journal 43.7: 431-432

60s BC births
10s deaths
Ancient Greek grammarians
1st-century BC Egyptian people
Ancient Egyptian writers
Ancient Greek lexicographers